The San Angelo Sheep Herders were a West Texas League baseball team based in San Angelo, Texas, United States that played in 1929. They were the last team to play in San Angelo until the San Angelo Colts came about in 1948.

Notable players include Walt Alexander and Uel Eubanks.

References

Defunct minor league baseball teams
Sports in San Angelo, Texas
Baseball teams established in 1929
Baseball teams disestablished in 1929
1929 establishments in Texas
1929 disestablishments in Texas
Defunct baseball teams in Texas